Nototriton tapanti, commonly known as the Tapanti moss salamander, is a species of salamander in the family Plethodontidae.
It is endemic to the Cordillera de Talamanca, Costa Rica.

Its natural habitat is tropical moist montane forests.
It is threatened by habitat loss.

References

Nototriton
Amphibians described in 1993
Amphibians of Costa Rica
Endemic fauna of Costa Rica
Taxonomy articles created by Polbot